The Pioneer Venus project was part of the Pioneer program consisting of two spacecraft, the Pioneer Venus Orbiter and the Pioneer Venus Multiprobe, launched to Venus in 1978. The program was managed by NASA's Ames Research Center.

The Pioneer Venus Orbiter entered orbit around Venus on December 4, 1978, and performed observations to characterize the atmosphere and surface of Venus. It continued to transmit data until October 1992.

The Pioneer Venus Multiprobe deployed four small probes into the Venusian atmosphere on December 9, 1978. All four probes transmitted data throughout their descent to the surface. One probe survived the landing and transmitted data from the surface for over an hour.

Overview
The Pioneer mission consisted of two components, launched separately: an orbiter and a multiprobe.

Orbiter

The orbiter was launched on May 20, 1978 on an Atlas-Centaur rocket. The Pioneer Venus Orbiter was inserted into an elliptical orbit around Venus on December 4, 1978. It carried 17 experiments (with a total mass of 45 kg): 
a cloud photopolarimeter to measure the vertical distribution of the clouds 
a surface radar mapper to determine topography and surface characteristics 
an infrared radiometer to measure IR emissions from the Venus atmosphere 
an airglow ultraviolet spectrometer to measure scattered and emitted UV light 
a neutral mass spectrometer to determine the composition of the upper atmosphere 
a solar wind plasma analyzer to measure properties of the solar wind 
a magnetometer to characterize the magnetic field at Venus 
an electric field detector to study the solar wind and its interactions 
an electron temperature probe to study the thermal properties of the ionosphere 
an ion mass spectrometer to characterize the ionospheric ion population 
a charged particle retarding potential analyzer to study ionospheric particles 
two radio science experiments to determine the gravity field of Venus 
a radio occultation experiment to characterize the atmosphere 
an atmospheric drag experiment to study the upper atmosphere 
a radio science atmospheric and solar wind turbulence experiment 
a gamma ray burst detector to record gamma-ray burst events

In May 1992 the orbiter began the final phase of its mission, in which the periapsis was held between 150 and 250 km until the fuel ran out and atmospheric entry destroyed the spacecraft in August 1992.

Multiprobe

The Pioneer Venus Multiprobe was launched on August 8, 1978 on an Atlas-Centaur rocket. It consisted of a 290 kg bus which carried one large (315 kg) and three small atmospheric probes.  The large probe was released on November 16, 1978 and the three small probes on November 20. All four probes entered the Venus atmosphere on December 9, followed by the bus.

The Pioneer Venus large probe was about 1.5 m in diameter and equipped with 7 science experiments. After deceleration from initial atmospheric entry at about 11.5 km/s, a parachute was deployed at 47 km altitude. The probe stopped broadcasting when it impacted the surface. The science experiments were: 
a neutral mass spectrometer to measure the atmospheric composition 
a gas chromatograph to measure the atmospheric composition 
a solar flux radiometer to measure solar flux penetration in the atmosphere 
an infrared radiometer to measure distribution of infrared radiation 
a cloud particle size spectrometer to measure particle size and shape 
a nephelometer to search for cloud particles 
temperature, pressure, and acceleration sensors

The three small probes were identical to each other, 0.8 m in diameter and 90 kg each small probe. The small probes were each targeted at different parts of the planet;  They had no parachutes and the aeroshells did not separate from the probe. Two of the small probes reached the surface, and one of these, the day probe, continued to broadcast for 67 minutes and 37 seconds after reaching the surface.

The Pioneer Venus bus also carried two experiments, a neutral mass spectrometer and an ion mass spectrometer to study the composition of the atmosphere. With no heat shield or parachute, the bus made measurements only to about 110 km altitude before burning up.

See also

 1978 in spaceflight
 Vega program
 Venera program

References

External links

 NASA: Pioneer Venus Project Information
 Pioneer Venus Program Page by NASA's Solar System Exploration
 NSSDC Master Catalog: Spacecraft Pioneer Venus Probe Bus. (Other components of the mission have their own pages at this site too.)
 Pioneer Venus specifications at NASA
 "The Pioneer Venus Orbiter: 11 years of data." Results published on May 1, 1990.
Art for the mission

Missions to Venus
Pioneer program
1978 in spaceflight
Spacecraft launched in 1978